Maughold Head is the easternmost point of the Isle of Man and the closest point in the Isle of Man to England, being  from St. Bees Head in Cumbria.

Maughold Head lighthouse
Located at the very end of the headland is the Maughold Head Lighthouse which was built in 1914. Although now unmanned, it continues to be operated by the Northern Lighthouse Board.

References

External links 
Isle of Man government website about Maughold Head
Northern Lighthouse Board history of the lighthouse

Headlands of the Isle of Man